This is a list of women writers born in France or whose writings are closely associated with France.

A
Geneviève Aclocque (1884–1967), historian
Juliette Adam (1836–1936), novelist, non-fiction writer and magazine editor
Marie d'Agoult, pen name Daniel Stern (1805–1876), novelist, essayist and history writer
Mathilde Alanic (1864-1948), novelist, short story writer
Anne-Marie Albiach (1937–2012), poet and translator
Hortense Allart (1801–1879), feminist writer and essayist
Almucs de Castelnau (12th c.), troubadour poet writing in Occitan
Catherine d'Amboise (1475–1550), semi-autobiographical novelist and poet
Virginie Ancelot (1792–1875), painter and playwright
Alix André (1909-2000), romance novelist
Christine Angot (born 1959), novelist and playwright
Azalaïs d'Arbaud (1834–1917), Occitan-language writer
Sophie d'Arbouville (1810–1850), poet and short story writer
Catherine Arley, pen name of Pierrette Pernot (born 1924), novelist and actress
Marie Célestine Amélie d'Armaillé (1830–1918), writer, biographer and historian
Angélique Arnaud (1799–1884), novelist, essayist and feminist
Madeleine de l’Aubespine (1546–1596), poet, literary patron, and one of the earliest female erotic poets
Gwenaëlle Aubry (born 1971), novelist, philosopher and non-fiction writer
Colette Audry (1906–1990), novelist, screenwriter and critic
Marie-Catherine d'Aulnoy (c. 1650–1705), writer of fairy tales and historical novels
Félicie d'Ayzac (1801–1881), poet, art historian
Azalais de Porcairagues (12th century), Occitan-language troubadour

B
Victoire Babois (1760–1839), writer of elegies.
Marie-Claire Bancquart (1932–2019), poet, essayist, critic and educator
Tristane Banon (born 1979), novelist, journalist and television presenter
Arvède Barine (1840–1908), non-fiction writer, historian and literary critic
Natalie Clifford Barney (1876–1972), American-born poet, playwright and novelist, who wrote mainly in French
Lauren Bastide (born 1981), French journalist
Sophie Bawr (1773–1860), playwright, non-fiction writer
Fanny de Beauharnais (1737–1813), poet, novelist, playwright and salonist
Simone de Beauvoir (1908–1986), novelist, essayist, existentialist philosopher and feminist
Béatrix Beck (1914–2008), novelist, short story writer and poet of Belgian origin
Alice Becker-Ho (born 1941), poet and non-fiction writer
Claude de Bectoz (1490–1547), poet and letter writer
Géraldine Beigbeder, novelist, screen-writer
Maud de Belleroche (1922–2017), bestselling novelist, memoirist and biographer
Loleh Bellon (1925–1999), actress and playwright
Yannick Bellon (1924–2019), film director and screenwriter
Juliette Benzoni (1920–2016), novelist
Catherine Bernard (1662–1712), poet, playwright and novelist
Paulette Bernège (1896–1973), journalist, housework specialist and prolific non-fiction writer
Emmanuèle Bernheim (1955–2017), novelist and screenwriter
Carmen Bernos de Gasztold (1919–1995), poet
Louise Bertin (1805–1877), composer and poet
Mireille Best (1943–2005), novelist, often featuring lesbian characters
Nella Bielski (1930s – 2020), Ukrainian-born French novelist and actress
Gisèle Bienne (born 1946), novelist and writer for young adults
Raphaële Billetdoux (born 1951), novelist
Augustine-Malvina Blanchecotte (1830–1897), poet
Stella Blandy (1836-1925), writer and feminist
Janine Boissard (born 1932), writer
Lucie Boissonnas (1839-1877), author
Marie Bonaparte-Wyse (1831–1902), novelist, playwright
Louise de Bossigny (died 1700), fairy tale writer
Laurence Bougault (1970–2018), poet, essayist and travel writer
Claire Bouilhac (born 1970), bande dessinée illustrator, scriptwriter, colorist
Catherine de Bourbon (1559–1604), princess, poet and letter writer
Louise Bourbonnaud (c. 1847–1915), writer, explorer and philanthropist
Jeanne Bouvier (1865–1964), feminist and trade unionist
Sarah Bouyain (born 1968), novelist and film director
Nina Bouraoui (born 1967), novelist
Dounia Bouzar (born 1964), anthropologist and writer
Brada (1847–1938), novelist, biographer, memoirist, scriptwriter
Marie-Anne de Bovet (1855 – unknown date), novelist and journalist
Anne-Sophie Brasme (born 1984), novelist
Geneviève Brisac (born 1951), novelist, short-story writer, children's writer, critic and screenwriter
Josette Bruce (1920–1996), Polish-born novelist
Fabienne Brugère (born in 1964), non-fiction
Andrée Brunin (1937–1993), poet, many of whose works have been set to music

C
Claude Cahun(1894–1954), poet, novelist, photograph, essayist, translator and résistante
Nina de Callias (1843–1884), poet and salonnière
Amélie-Julie Candeille (1767–1834), composer, librettist and playwright
Marcelle Capy (1891–1962), novelist, journalist and pacifist
Marie Cardinal (1929–2001), novelist
Pauline Cassin Caro (1828/34/35–1901), novelist
Castelloza (13th century), troubadour poet
Claire Castillon (born 1975), novelist and playwright
Bernadette Cattanéo (1899-1963), newspaper editor, magazine co-founder, trade unionist, and communist activist
Anne-Marie Cazalis (1920–1988), journalist, poet, essayist, novelist and actress
Charlotte-Rose de Caumont de La Force (1654–1724), successful novelist, poet and memoirist
Rosine de Chabaud-Latour (1794–1860), translator.
Françoise Chandernagor (born 1945), novelist and playwright
Véronique Chankowski (born 1971), French historian, non-fiction writer
Edmonde Charles-Roux (1920–2016), novelist, journalist and photographer
Noëlle Châtelet (born 1944), essayist, novelist, short story writer and educator
Chantal Chawaf (born 1943), novelist and essayist
Madeleine Chapsal (born 1925), novelist, poet and critic
Charlotte Saumaise de Chazan (1619–1684), poet and lady in waiting
Élisabeth Sophie Chéron (1648–1711), painter, poet and translator
Maryse Choisy (1903–1979), philosopher, novelist and non-fiction writer 
Hélène Cixous (born 1937), Algerian-born French novelist, poet, playwright, philosopher, critic and feminist writer
Fanny Clar (1875-1944), French journalist and writer
Catherine Clément (born 1939), philosopher, novelist, feminist and critic
Gabrielle de Coignard (1550–1586), religious poet
Louise Colet (1810–1876), poet, novelist, salonist
Colette (1873–1954), novelist, author of Gigi
Henriette de Coligny de La Suze (1618–1673), poet
Anne-Hyacinthe de Colleville (1761–1824), novelist and playwright
Danielle Collobert (1940–1978), poet, novelist, short story writer and journalist 
Rose Combe (1883–1932), novelist
Sophie Ristaud Cottin (1770–1807), novelist, including several historical novels
Hélisenne de Crenne (1510–1552), novelist, epistolary writer and translator
Pauline Marie Armande Craven (1808–1891), non-fiction writer

D
Jocelyne Dakhlia (born 1959), French historian, anthropologist and academic
Gilberte H. Dallas, pen name of Gilberte Herschtel (1918–1960), poet, important member of the poètes maudits
Gerty Dambury (born 1957), poet, playwright and theatre director from Guadeloupe
Marie Darrieussecq (born 1969), novelist
Countess Dash, pen name of Gabrielle Anne Cisterne de Courtiras, vicomtesse de Saint-Mars (1804–1872), novelist
Régine Deforges (1935–2014), novelist, short story writer, essayist and playwright
Alix Delaporte (born 1969), film director and screenwriter
Lucie Delarue-Mardrus (1874–1945), poet, novelist, journalist and sculptor
Florence Delay (born 1941), novelist, essayist, playwright, translator and actress
Jeanine Delpech (1905-1992), journalist, translator, novelist
Sylvie Denis (born 1963), novelist, magazine editor and translator
Maria Deraismes (1828–1894), playwright, essayist and women's rights activist 
Marceline Desbordes-Valmore (1786–1859), poet and novelist
Antoinette Des Houlières (1638–1694), poet
Marie-Anne Desmarest (1904–1973), novelist
Catherine Des Roches (1542–1587), Renaissance poet, daughter of Madelaine Des Roches
Madeleine Des Roches (c.1520–1587), Renaissance poet, mother of Catherine Des Roches
Madeleine Desroseaux (1873–1939), Breton poet, novelist, playwright and short story writer
Jeanne Deroin (1805–1894), journalist and women's activist after the Revolution  
Dominique Desanti (1920–2011), journalist, novelist, biographer and educator
Agnès Desarthe (born 1966), children's writer and novelist
Marceline Desbordes-Valmore (1786–1859), poet
Maryline Desbiolles (born 1959), novelist
Anne Desclos (1907–1998), journalist, novelist and translator, known under pen-names Pauline Réage and Dominique Aury
Madeleine Desroseaux (1873–1939), Breton-language poet and novelist
Régine Deforges (1935–2014) best-selling novelist, editor, director and playwright, known for her erotic works
Antoinette Deshoulières (1638–1694), poet
Virginie Despentes (born 1969), novelist and autobiographer
Marie Desplechin (born 1959), novelist and children's writer
Jane Dieulafoy (1851–1916), archaeologist, novelist and journalist
Clotilde Dissard (1873-1919), journalist and feminist
Louisa Emily Dobrée (fl. ca. 1877–1917), novelist, short story writer, children's writer, non-fiction writer
Geneviève Dormann (1933–2015), journalist and novelist
Camille Drevet (1881-1969), editor-in-chief, La Voix des femmes
Pernette Du Guillet (c.1520–1545), Renaissance poet
Caroline Dubois (born 1960), poet
Charlotte Dubreuil (born 1940), novelist, filmmaker and screenwriter
Catherine Dufour (born 1966), novelist
Claire de Duras (1777–1828), novelist, author of Ourika
Marguerite Duras (1914–1996), novelist, playwright and screenwriter of Hiroshima mon amour
Vanessa Duriès (1972–1993), novelist author of The Ties That Bind
Yvette Duval (1931–2006), Moroccan-born French historian specializing in ancient North Africa

E
Françoise d'Eaubonne (1920–2005), feminist essayist and science fiction novelist
Alexandrine des Écherolles (1779–1850), memoirist
Catherine Enjolet, French novelist and essayist
Annie Ernaux (born 1940), autobiographical novelist
Gisèle d'Estoc (1845-1894), writer, sculptor, and feminist
Claire Etcherelli (born 1934), novelist

F
Geneviève Fauconnier (1886–1969), novelist
Madame de La Fayette (1634–1693), novelist author of La Princesse de Clèves
Amanda Filipacchi (born 1967), French-born American novelist
Adelaide Filleul (1761–1836), novelist
Clara Filleul (1822–1878), painter and children's writer
Zénaïde Fleuriot (1829–1890), prolific novelist writing for young women
Pierrette Fleutiaux (1941–2019), novelist and short story writer
Brigitte Fontaine (born 1939), singer, novelist, playwright and poet
Viviane Forrester (1925–2013), essayist, novelist and critic
Jeanne-Justine Fouqueau de Pussy (1786–1863), author of children's and educational works
Jocelyne François (born 1933), lesbian novelist, poet and diarist
Camille Froidevaux-Metterie (born 1968), non-fiction writer and novelist

G
Marie-Louise Gagneur (1832–1902), essayist, novelist and feminist
Jeanne Galzy (1883–1977), novelist and biographer
Anne-Marie Garat (1946–2022), novelist
Delphine Gardey (born 1967), non-fiction writer
Anne F. Garréta (born 1962), novelist
Judith Gautier (1845–1917), poet, historical novelist, playwright, translator and music critic  
Anna Gavalda (born 1970), best-selling novelist, short story writer and works widely translated
Sophie Gay (1776–1852), novelist, playwright and librettist
Stéphanie Félicité, comtesse de Genlis (1746–1830), novelist, playwright and children's writer
Rosemonde Gérard (1871–1953), poet and playwright
Sylvie Germain (born 1954), novelist, essayist and biographer
Amélie Gex (1835–1883), poet, who also wrote in Franco-Provençal
Delphine de Girardin (1804–1855), essayist, poet and novelist
Anne Golon (1921–2017), novelist author of the Angélique series of historical novels
Mélanie Gouby (active since 2011), journalist
Olympe de Gouges (1748–1793), playwright and feminist writer, executed after the Revolution
Marie de Gournay (1585–1645), novelist, essayist and critic
Françoise de Graffigny (1695–1758), novelist and playwright
Évelyne Grandjean (born 1939), actress, playwright and screenwriter
Virginie Greiner (born 1969), comic book scriptwriter
Henry Gréville, pen name of Alice Durand (1842–1902), widely translated novelist  
Benoîte Groult (1920–2016), novelist and feminist
Claudine Guérin de Tencin (1682–1749), literary patron, novelist and correspondent
Pernette du Guillet (c. 1520–1545), poet, most of whose works were intended to be set to music

H
Béatrice Hammer (born 1963), novelist, children's writer and playwright
Myriam Harry (1869-1958), significant pre 1914 writer, daughter of Moses Shapira.
Mireille Havet (1898–1932), poet, diarist and novelist
Nathalie Henneberg (1910–1977), science fiction novelist
Marie de Hennezel (born 1946), non-fiction writer
Catherine Hermary-Vieille (born 1943), novelist
Juliette Heuzey (1865-1952), novelist, biographer
Adèle Hommaire de Hell (1819–1883), explorer and travel writer
Juliette Heuzey (1865–1952), novelist, biographer
Violaine Huisman (born 1979), novelist, essayist, cultural journalist

J
Paula Jacques (born 1949), Egyptian-born French novelist, journalist and radio host
Martine L. Jacquot (born 1955), French-born Canadian academic, novelist, poet, short story writer, journalist
Gaëlle Josse (born 1960), poet and novelist
Alice Jouenne  (1873-1954), French educator, socialist activist, and writer

K
Fabienne Kanor (born 1970), journalist, novelist and filmmaker
Maylis de Kerangal (born 1967), novelist
Kiyémis (born 1993), poet, Afro-feminist
Nadia Yala Kisukidi (born 1978), philosopher
Thérèse Kuoh-Moukouri (born 1938), Cameroon-born French novelist and essayist

L
Anne de La Roche-Guilhem (1644–1710), novelist, moved to England
Sylvie Lainé (born 1957), science fiction novelist and short story writer
Jeanne Lapauze (1860–1920), born Jeanne Loiseau, poet and novelist, who used the pen name Daniel Lesueur
Oriane Lassus (born 1987), author, cartoonist, illustrator
Camille Laurens (born 1957), novelist
Linda Lê (born 1963), Vietnamese-born French novelist
Simone Le Bargy (1877–1985), actress, novelist and memoirist
Martine Le Coz (born 1955), novelist, poet and non-fiction writer
Violette Leduc (1907–1972), novelist and autobiographer
Marie Léopold-Lacour (1859-1942), feminist activist, writer, and storyteller
Jeanne-Marie Leprince de Beaumont (1711–1780), novelist and fairy tale writer, author of Beauty and the Beast
Marie Léra (1864–1958), journalist, novelist, and translator
Michèle Lesbre (born 1939), writer and novelist
Grace Ly (born 1979), writer, podcaster, feminist

M
Jeanne Marni (1854–1910), novelist, playwright and essayist
Anne de Marquets (c. 1533–1588), religious poet, nun and author of Les Sonets spirituels
Agnès Martin-Lugand (born 1979), novelist
Margaret Maruani (1954–2022), non-fiction writer
Sophie Massieu (born 1975), journalist
Renée Massip (1907–2002), novelist, journalist
Nicole-Claude Mathieu (1937–2014), sociologist specializing in gender studies
Diane Mazloum (born 1980), French-Lebanese writer
Meavenn, pen name of Francine Rozec (1911–1992), Breton-language poet, novelist and playwright
Natacha Michel (born 1941), political activist, novelist and critic
Hélène Miard-Delacroix (born 1959), historian, Germanist, professor
Marijane Minaberri (1926–2017), children's, poet and short story
Jane Misme (1865–1935), journalist and feminist
Ursule Molinaro (1916–2000), French-American novelist, playwright and translator, who wrote in French and English
Kenizé Mourad (born 1939), journalist, non-fiction writer and novelist

N
Claire Julie de Nanteuil (1834-1897), children's literature writer
Marguerite de Navarre (1492–1549), poet, playwright and short story writer, including the collection Heptaméron
Marie NDiaye (born 1967), novelist and playwright
Anna de Noailles (1876–1933), highly acclaimed novelist, poet and autobiographer
Florence Noiville (born 1961), journalist, children's writer, novelist and non-fiction writer

O
Véronique Olmi (born 1962), novelist, playwright and short story writer
Mona Ozouf (born 1931), historian and philosopher

P
Katherine Pancol (born 1954), novelist, journalist and author of Les Yeux jaunes des crocodiles (The Yellow Eyes of Crocodiles)
Ève Paul-Margueritte (1885-1971), novelist 
Lucie Paul-Margueritte (1886-1955), writer and translator
Madeleine Pelletier (1874–1939), feminist writer
Gabrielle Petit (feminist) (1860–1952), newspaper editor
Georges de Peyrebrune (1841–1917), prolific novelist, columnist and feminist
Louise Pioger (1848-1920) anarchist nursery rhymes
Anne Plichota (born 1968), children's writer and novelist
Maria Pognon (1844–1925), writer, journal editor, feminist, suffragist and pacifist
Aliénor de Poitiers (15th century), writer on court etiquette
Renada-Laura Portet (1927-2021), poet, prose writer, non-fiction writer
Alice Poulleau (1885–1960), travel writer and geographer

R
Rachilde, pen name of Marguerite Vallette-Eymery (1860–1953), novelist and non-fiction writer, author of Monsieur Vénus
Geneviève-Françoise Randon de Malboissière (1746–1766), playwright, poet and multi-lingual translator
Fanny Raoul (1771-1833), feminist writer, journalist, philosopher and essayist
Pauline Réage, pen-name of Anne Desclos (1907–1998), who also used the pen-name Dominique Aury, novelist, editor, critic and author of Story of O (Histoire d'O)
Marie Redonnet, pen name of Martine L'hospitalier (born 1948), poet, novelist, essayist, short story writer and playwright
Christine Renard (1929–1979), science fiction novelist
Gabrielle Réval (1869-1938), novelist and essayist
Yasmina Reza (born 1959), playwright, novelist, actress, screenwriter and author of God of Carnage
Marie Jeanne Riccoboni (1714–1792), novelist and editor
Catherine Rihoit (born 1950), novelist and biographer
Blandine Rinkel (born 1991), novelist 
Christine de Rivoyre (1921–2019), novelist and journalist
Antoinette Henriette Clémence Robert (1797–1872), novelist and playwright
Nina Roberts (born 1979), erotic novelist and actress
Tatiana de Rosnay (born 1961), journalist, novelist and screenwriter, 
Marie-Anne de Roumier-Robert (1705–1771), early science fiction novelist
Pascale Roze (born 1954), playwright and novelist, author of Sarah's Key (Elle s'appelait Sarah)
Léonie Rouzade (1839–1916), journalist, novelist and feminist

S
Françoise Sagan (1935–2004), playwright, novelist and screenwriter, author of Bonjour Tristesse
Vefa de Saint-Pierre (1872–1967), explorer, reporter, Breton-language poet and children's writer 
Lydie Salvayre (born 1948), novelist widely translated
George Sand (1804–1876), novelist and playwright, author of Indiana
Anne de Seguier 16th-century French poet and salon holder
Nathalie Sarraute (1900–1999), Russian-born French novelist, who pioneered the nouveau roman
Albertine Sarrazin (1937–1967), French-Algerian novelist, essayist and poet 
Simone Schwarz-Bart (born 1938), Guadeloupean-French novelist, playwright and non-fiction writer
Ann Scott (born 1965), novelist, short story writer
Madeleine de Scudéry (1607–1701), novelist, works containing lengthy conversations
Countess of Ségur (1799–1874), Russian-born French novelist and children's writer
Eulalie de Senancour (1791–1876), journalist, novelist and children's writer
Coline Serreau (born 1947), actress, film director, playwright and essayist
Marie de Rabutin-Chantal, marquise de Sévigné (1626–1696), correspondent
Shan Sa, pen name of Yan Ni (born 1972), Chinese-born French poet, novelist and painter, now writing in French
Maboula Soumahoro (born 1976), scholar, Afro-feminist
Germaine de Staël, also Madame de Staël (1766–1817), essayist, novelist, non-fiction writer and salonnière
Louise Swanton Belloc (1796–1881), translator, essayist, novelist, non-fiction writer, children's book writer and feminist

T
Tibors de Sarenom (12th century), troubadour poet writing in Occitan
Marie-Louise Tenèze (1922–2016), ethnologist, folklorist
Françoise Thébaud (born 1952), historian and professor emeritus
Françoise Thom (born 1951), historian and Sovietologist
Chantal Thomas (born 1945), historian and novelist
Édith Thomas (1909–1970), novelist, historian and journalist
Gilles Thomas, pen name of Éliane Taïeb (1929–1985), science fiction novelist
Annette Tison (born 1942), architect, children's writer and co-creator of Barbapapa
Valerie Toranian (born 1962), journalist and editor of Elle
Nicole Tourneur (1950–2011), novelist and children's writer
Elsa Triolet (1896–1970), Russian-born French novelist, first women to win the Prix Goncourt, wrote in Russian and French
Nadine Trintignant (born 1934), film editor, writer, director, producer and novelist
Flora Tristan (1803–1844), socialist writer and feminist

V
Valérie Valère (1961–1981), autobiographical novelist
Fred Vargas, pen name of Frédérique Audoin-Rouzeau (born 1957), crime fiction writer and historian
Delphine de Vigan (born 1966), novelist and author of  No et moi, translated into 20 languages 
Marie-Catherine de Villedieu (1640–1683), playwright, novelist and short story writer
Gabrielle-Suzanne Barbot de Villeneuve (c.1695–1755), novelist, fairy tale writer and author of Belle et la Bête
Louise Lévêque de Vilmorin (1902–1969), novelist, poet and journalist
Renée Vivien (1877–1909), British-born French-language poet, often writing autobiographical verse
Élisabeth Vonarburg (born 1947), science-fiction novelist

W
Simone Weil (1909–1943), philosopher and non-fiction writer
Anne Wiazemsky (1947–2017), German-born French novelist and actress
Joëlle Wintrebert (born 1949), science fiction novelist and children's writer
Monique Wittig (1935–2003), novelist, playwright and feminist writer
Cendrine Wolf (born 1969), children's writer, who collaborates with Anne Plichota

Y
Marguerite Yourcenar (1903–1987), novelist and essayist

Z
Léontine Zanta (1872–1942), novelist and feminist

References

See also
List of French-language authors
List of women writers

-
Lists of women writers by nationality
Writers
Women writers
Women writers